Rahid Ulusel (full name Rahid Suleyman Khalilov) is an Azerbaijani scientist, senior researcher at the Azerbaijan National Academy of Sciences, and professor at Western University (2005-2007).

Biography 
Rahid Ulusel was born in Kəlbəhüseynli village of Masally District of the Republic of Azerbaijan on 13 August 1954. Graduated Azerbaijan State Pedagogical University. The topic of his PhD thesis is “Contemporary Azerbaijani Philosophical Lyrics”. The total number of Ulusel's printed scientific publications is 215.

The valuable works of Ulusel are about the actual problems of philosophy, aesthetics, culturology, philology and criticism. They were published in Azerbaijan and abroad. Ulusel is a member of the Union of Azerbaijani Writers, the Dissertation Council of the Institute of Philosophy of ANAS, the International Federation of Philosophical Societies, vice-president of the Biocosmology Association for the Middle East. Rahid Ulusel represented Azerbaijan at several international congresses on humanitarian sciences (US, Sweden, Greece, Korea, etc.).

Scientific works 
 Contemporary Azerbaijani Philosophical Lyrics (in Russian). Baku: Science Press, 1985
 Rasul Rza's poetry (in Azerbaijani). Baku: Yazichi, 1985
 The National Self-Understanding and Geostrategy in the Age of Globalization (in Azerbaijani). Baku: Azerbaijan National Encyclopedia, 2002
 The US-Turkey-Azerbaijan Relationship and the Russian Philosophical and Political Approaches to It (in Turkish) // 2023 Futurological Journal, Ankara, 2003, December.
 The Silk Road of Cultures (in Azerbaijani). Baku: Education Press, 2003
 Culture and Techno civilization (in Azerbaijani). Baku: Azerbaijan National Encyclopedia, 2003
 Globalization and Turkic Civilization (in Azerbaijani). Baku: Chashioglu Press, 2005
 Globalization and the Philosophy of Harmony (in Azerbaijani). Baku: Science Press, 2005
 The Philosophy of Harmony in the Cultures of Islamic East and Western Renaissance // The Problems of Eastern Philosophy (in Russian), 2005–2006, No. 1-2
 Civilization as a New Scientific Field // Azerbaijan in the World, 2006, No. 1
 Globalization and Turkic Civilization // Azerbaijan in the World, 2006, No. 1
 The Universe is the Cell, the Cell is the Universe (in Azerbaijani). Baku: Europe Press, 2008
 Paradigmal Rethinking of World Development towards Global Civilization // Proceedings of the XXII World Congress of Philosophy. Social and Political Philosophy, 2008, Volume 50, p. 321-330
 Homo-universalism // Third Global Civilization World Congress (Web Conference) (in English and Chinese).
 Turks in the Civilizational Evolution of Eurasia // Problems of Art and Culture. International Scientific Journal, Baku, 2009, No.4 (30)
 Essayistic (in Azerbaijani). Baku: Europe Press, 2009
 Contemporary Azerbaijani Criticism (in Azerbaijani). Baku: Science Press, 2009
 Rhythms of Life and Thought (in Azerbaijani). Baku: Chashioglu Press, 2009
 Master Rasul Rza. Philosophy and Poetry: Their Synthesis in the Classics of World and Azerbaijan (in Azerbaijani). Baku: Letterpress, 2010
 Harmony Philosophy and the New World Order Principles // ICCEES VIII World Congress. Eurasia: Prospects for Wider Cooperation. Abstracts. 2010, July 26–31, Stockholm, Sweden, p. 129
 Heydar Aliyev and the International Relations of Azerbaijan: from Politics to Culture (in Azerbaijani). Baku: Ideal-Print, 2010
 Homo-universalism as an Integral Idea of the Multi civilizational World // International Journal of Arts and Sciences (IJAS), 2011, Vol. 4, No.23
 Globalization and the Philosophic-Aesthetical Problems of the Contemporary Literature (in Azerbaijani). Baku: Qoliaf Group Press, 2012
 Metaphilosophically Approach to Harmonic-World- System / XXIII World Congress of Philosophy, Philosophy as an Inquiry and a Way of Life. Athens, 4 – 10 August 2013, School of Philosophy, National & Kapodistrian University of Athens, Greece, p. 338

Awards and prizes 
 Medal of the Ministry of Education of former USSR (1990) 
 Grant of the President of the Republic of Azerbaijan (2009)

References

External links

Azerbaijani philosophers
1954 births
Living people